Joshua Sylvester is an American football coach. He currently is the head coach at UMass Dartmouth. He was previously the offensive coordinator and quarterbacks coach for eleven seasons before being promoted following the retirement of Mark Robichaud.

Coaching career

UMass Dartmouth

Early years 
Sylvester began his career with UMass Dartmouth in 2009. He previously served as an offensive line, running back, and safety coach before being named as offensive coordinator in 2011.

Head coaching 
On February 1, 2023, Sylvester was named the fourth head coach in UMass Dartmouth history following the retirement of 16-year coach Mark Robichaud.

Head coaching record

College

Personal life 
Sylvester graduated from Babson College in 2005 with a bachelor's degree in entrepreneurship and finance. He earned his masters in business administration from UMass Dartmouth in 2020. He has served as the director of alumni relations for UMass Dartmouth after he earned his master's degree.

References

External links 

 UMass Dartmouth Corsairs bio

Living people
UMass Dartmouth Corsairs football coaches
Babson College alumni
University of Massachusetts Dartmouth faculty
University of Massachusetts Dartmouth alumni
Year of birth missing (living people)